Revelator is the debut album by the 11-piece blues rock group Tedeschi Trucks Band released in 2011 by Sony Masterworks. Recorded in Derek and Susan's Swamp Raga Studios in Jacksonville, co-produced by Derek with producer/engineer Jim Scott. The album won the Grammy Award for Best Blues Album at the 54th Grammy Awards.

Reception

Allmusic music critic Thom Jurek praised the album and wrote the recording "proves something beyond their well-founded reputation as a live unit: that they can write, perform, and produce great songs that capture the authentic, emotional fire and original arrangements that so many modern blues and roots recordings lack... Revelator is a roots record that sets a modern standard even as it draws its inspiration from the past. It's got everything a listener could want: grit, groove, raw, spiritual emotion, and expert-level musical truth." David Fricke of Rolling Stone wrote "[Trucks] and Tedeschi, a perfect vocal foil, now front the best Dixie-funk family band since Delaney and Bonnie Bramlett."

Track listing

Personnel
 Derek Trucks – slide guitar
 Susan Tedeschi – lead vocals, rhythm guitar
 Oteil Burbridge – bass guitar
 Kofi Burbridge  – keyboards, flute
 Tyler Greenwell – drums, percussion
 J. J. Johnson – drums, percussion
 Mike Mattison – harmony vocals
 Mark Rivers – harmony vocals
 Kebbi Williams – saxophone
 Maurice "Mobetta" Brown – trumpet
 Saunders Sermons – trombone

Additional musicians
 Oliver Wood – guitar and vocals
 David Ryan Harris – guitar and vocals
 Ryan Shaw – harmony vocals
 Eric Krasno – acoustic guitar
 Alam Khan – sarod
 Salar Nader – tabla

Credits
 Producers – Jim Scott and Derek Trucks
 Engineers – Jim Scott and Bobby Tis
 Additional Engineer – Kevin Dean
 Mixing – Jim Scott
 Mastering – Bob Ludwig
 Art Direction – Josh Cheuse
 Photography – James Minchin

Chart positions

References 

Grammy Award for Best Blues Album
Tedeschi Trucks Band albums
2011 debut albums
Albums produced by Jim Scott (producer)